Chatoyer may refer to:
                  
Joseph Chatoyer, Garifuna chief
Chatoyancy, a visual quality of some gems